Anand Menon (born September 1965) is Professor of European Politics and Foreign Affairs at King's College London in the United Kingdom and was appointed in January 2014 as director of the UK in a Changing Europe initiative. He was a special adviser to the House of Lords EU committee.

Academic career
Prior to arriving at King's College, London, Menon lectured at Birmingham University. Previously he was Lecturer in European Politics at Oxford University for ten years and a Fellow of St Antony's College, Oxford for five.

Menon is the Director of UK in a Changing Europe, a think tank funded by the Economic and Social Research Council (ESRC) and based at King’s College London.

Bibliography
His publications include European Politics (Oxford University Press, 2007), co-edited with Colin Hay and Europe: The State of the Union (Atlantic Books, 2008), and he has written for popular publications including the Financial Times, the London Review of Books and Prospect.

References

External links
 King‘s College London homepage
 
 UK in a Changing Europe website

1965 births
Living people
People educated at Queen Elizabeth Grammar School, Wakefield
Alumni of the University of Oxford
Academics of the University of Birmingham
Fellows of St Antony's College, Oxford
British political scientists
Academics of King's College London
British people of Indian descent
Alumni of Nuffield College, Oxford